{{Speciesbox
| image = Maireana thesioides (8691876621).jpg
| genus = Maireana
| species =thesioides
| authority = (C.A.Gardner) Paul G.Wilson
| synonyms = 
<small>Kochia thesioides C.A.Gardner</small>
|synonyms_ref = 
}}Maireana thesioides (common name - Mulga blue-bush) is a plant in the Amaranthaceae family, native to Western Australia.

It was first described as Kochia thesioides by Charles Austin Gardner in 1941 or 1942,   but was transferred to the genus, Maireana'' in 1975 by Paul Graham Wilson.

References

External links
Maireana thesioides: images & occurrence data from GBIF

Taxa named by Charles Gardner
Plants described in 1941
Flora of Western Australia
thesioides